The Aramá River is a river of Pará state in north-central Brazil. It is a right tributary of the Jacaré Grande River.

Course

The Aramá River rises on the island of Marajó in the delta region where the Amazon and Tocantins rivers empty into the Atlantic Ocean.
It forms the northern boundary in the western part of the Mapuá Extractive Reserve.
The Mapuá River, a left tributary of the Aramã, runs along the southern boundary of the reserve.
The reserve contains sheets of tidal water and mangroves.
The reserve is mostly lowland floodplain, with some terra firma in the centre of the territory.

See also
List of rivers of Pará

References

Sources

Rivers of Pará